Leptomantis  bimaculatus is a species of frog in the moss frog family (Rhacophoridae). Described by Wilhelm Peters in 1867, it is endemic to the Philippines. There, it is known to occur on the islands of Bohol, Mindanao, and in the south of Luzon; it might also be found on other islands as its known range brackets the main chain of the Philippines archipelago.

Its natural habitats are subtropical or tropical moist lowland forests, subtropical or tropical moist montane forests, rivers, intermittent rivers, and freshwater springs. It is threatened by habitat loss.

Taxonomy

This species was initially placed in the genus Leptomantis, as L. bimaculata. It was erroneously described a second time in 1922, under the junior synonym Philautus zamboangensis.  Leptomantis was later merged into Rhacophorus, and its name became the senior homonym of the R. bimaculatus named so by G. A. Boulenger in 1882; that species was subsequently renamed to R. bipunctatus. Now, the genus Leptomantis has been removed from synonymy with Rhacophorus and is recognised as a separate genus again. For some time, it was believed that similar frogs from Indonesia and Malaysia also belonged to the present species. But this was found to be wrong, and the western relative is now known as R. cyanopunctatus. Tadpoles from Borneo were also discussed under the name R. bimaculatus; these actually were of R. cyanopunctatus or R. gauni.

References

  (1927): Zur Systematik der asiatischen Arten der Froschgattung Rhacophorus ["Regarding the systematics of the Asian species of the frog genus Rhacophorus"]. Sitzungsberichte der Gesellschaft naturforschender Freunde Berlin 15: 35–47.
  (1867): Herpetologische Notizen ["Herpetological Notes"]. Monatsberichte der Königlich-Preussischen Akademie der Wissenschaften zu Berlin 1867: 13–37.
  (2004): Larval descriptions of some poorly known tadpoles from Peninsular Malaysia (Amphibia: Anura). Raffles Bulletin of Zoology 52(2): 609–620. PDF fulltext

External links
 Sound recordings of Rhacophorus bimaculatus at BioAcoustica

bimaculatus
Amphibians of the Philippines
Taxonomy articles created by Polbot
Amphibians described in 1867
Taxa named by Wilhelm Peters